Air Vice Marshal M Sayed Hossain OSP, BSP. GUP, ndc, psc is the incumbent Assistant Chief of Air Staff (Administration). Prior to Join in the current post, he was Air Officer Commanding(AOC) of Bangladesh Air Force Base Bangabandhu.

Career 
Hossain served as BAF director of air training, Air Headquarters before he promoted to Air Vice Marshal. He was promoted to Air Vice Marshal in 2018.

References 

Bangladesh Air Force personnel
Bangladesh Air Force
Living people
Year of birth missing (living people)